is a Japanese politician of the Liberal Democratic Party, a member of the House of Councillors in the Diet (national legislature). A native of Sakai, Osaka and graduate of Keio University, he was elected to the House of Councillors for the first time in 2004 after running unsuccessfully for the House of Representatives in 2000.

References

External links 
 Official website in Japanese.

1963 births
Living people
Democratic Party of Japan politicians
Japanese accountants
Keio University alumni
Members of the House of Councillors (Japan)